Anotosaura is a genus of South American lizards in the family Gymnophthalmidae.

Geographic range
The genus Anotosaura is endemic to Brazil.

Species
The genus Anotosaura contains two valid species.
Anotosaura collaris  - collared anotosaura
Anotosaura vanzolinia  - Vanzolini's anotosaura

References

Further reading
Amaral A (1933). "Estudos sobre lacertílios neotrópicos. I. Novos gêneros e espécies de lagartos do Brasil ". Memórias do Instituto Butantan 7: 51–75. (Anotosaura, new genus). (in Portuguese).

 
Lizard genera
Taxa named by Afrânio Pompílio Gastos do Amaral